Neot Kedumim, the Biblical Landscape Reserve in Israel is a Biblical garden and nature preserve located near Modi'in, midway between Jerusalem and Tel Aviv, Israel.

Etymology

Neot Kedumim means "pleasant pastures (or habitations) of old."

Overview
Neot Kedumim is an attempt to re-create the physical setting of the Hebrew Bible. The idea of planting such a garden dates back to 1925. In 1964, land was allocated for the project with the help of Prime Minister David Ben-Gurion.

Neot Kedumim comprises a series of natural and agricultural landscapes, among them the Forest of Milk and Honey, the Dale of the Song of Songs, Isaiah's Vineyard and the Fields of the Seven Species. Signs are posted throughout the garden quoting relevant Jewish texts in Hebrew and English.

Neot Kedumim offers pre-booked organized tours but is also accessible to individuals who can roam the site on their own with maps provided by the park.

History
When Ephraim and Hannah Hareuveni immigrated from Russia to Ottoman Palestine in 1912, they dreamed of developing a biblical landscape reserve that "embodied the panorama and power of the landscapes that both shaped the values of the Bible and provided a rich vocabulary for expressing them". Their son, Noga, a physicist, dedicated his life to implementing his parents' dream. To build the park, thousands of tons of soil were trucked in, reservoirs were built to catch runoff rain water, ancient terraces, wine presses and ritual baths were restored, and hundreds of varieties of plants were cultivated.

In 1994 Neot Kedumim and Noga Hareuveni,  the driving spirit behind the garden, were awarded the Israel Prize for their special contribution to society and the State of Israel.

Salvia and menorah
Plants in several species of the genus Salvia resemble the menorah.

See also 
 List of Israel Prize recipients
 Tourism in Israel
 Wildlife in Israel

References

External links

  Note: see Aaronsohnia for a picture of Aaronsohnia factorovskyi, a species in the daisy family.

Israel Prize recipients that are organizations
Israel Prize for special contribution to society and the State recipients
Parks in Israel
Protected areas of Central District (Israel)
Nature reserves in Israel
Bible-themed museums, zoos, and botanical gardens
Hebrew Bible in popular culture